The Los Angeles Angels are a Major League Baseball (MLB) franchise based in Anaheim, California. They play in the American League West division. The franchise has also gone by the names "Los Angeles Angels", "California Angels" and "Anaheim Angels" at various points in its history. The first game of the new baseball season for a team is played on Opening Day, and being named the Opening Day starter is an honor, which is often given to the player who is expected to lead the pitching staff that season, though there are various strategic reasons why a team's best pitcher might not start on Opening Day. The Angels have used 25 different Opening Day starting pitchers in their 51 seasons. The 25 starters have a combined Opening Day record of 26 wins, 18 losses and 7 no decisions. No decisions are awarded to the starting pitcher if the game is won or lost after the starting pitcher has left the game. It can also result if a starting pitcher does not pitch five full innings, even if his team retains the lead and wins.

Jered Weaver has the most Opening Day starts for the Angels, with seven, and had 6 consecutive opening day starts from 2010-2015.  He has a record of three wins and two losses, with one no decision in those starts that resulted in a win. Mike Witt has the second most starts, with five, with one win, three losses, and one no decision that resulted in a loss. Frank Tanana, Mark Langston and Chuck Finley have all made four Opening Day starts for the Angels.  Hall of Famer Nolan Ryan, Bartolo Colón and Jered Weaver have each made three such starts for the Angels.

Nolan Ryan has the Angels record for most wins in Opening Day starts with three. He also has the best win–loss record in Opening Day starts for the Angels, which is 3–0. The other Angels pitchers with multiple wins in Opening Day starts without a loss are Ken McBride and Andy Messersmith. Mike Witt has the record for most losses in Opening Day starts for the Angels with three. Frank Tanana and Chuck Finley each had two such losses.

The Angels have played in three home ball parks. They played their first season in Wrigley Field, which was designed to look like Wrigley Field in Chicago, but never played an Opening Day home game there. In 1962, they moved to Dodger Stadium, but only stayed there through 1965. They played two Opening Day games at Dodger Stadium, winning once and losing once. The Angels finally moved to Angel Stadium of Anaheim in 1966, which was first called Anaheim Stadium, then subsequently renamed Edison International Field of Anaheim later. They have played 29 Opening Day games there, and their starting pitchers have 15 wins and 12 losses with 2 no decisions. This makes their record at home in Opening Day games 15 wins and 13 losses with 2 no decisions. In Opening Day games on the road, their starting pitchers have a record of 10 wins and 5 losses with 5 no decisions.

The Angels have played in one World Series championship in their history, which they won in 2002. Jarrod Washburn was the Angels Opening Day starting pitcher that season. The Angels lost that Opening Day game to the Cleveland Indians. The winning pitcher for the Indians in that game was Bartolo Colón, who would make three Opening Day starts for the Angels later in his career.

Key

Pitchers

References

Opening day starters
Lists of Major League Baseball Opening Day starting pitchers